The Guastavino tile arch system is a version of Catalan vault introduced to the United States in 1885 by Spanish architect and builder Rafael Guastavino (1842–1908). It was patented in the United States by Guastavino in 1892.

Description
Guastavino vaulting is a technique for constructing robust, self-supporting arches and architectural vaults using interlocking terracotta tiles and layers of mortar to form a thin skin, with the tiles following the curve of the roof as opposed to horizontally (corbelling), or perpendicular to the curve (as in Roman vaulting). This is known as timbrel vaulting, because of supposed likeness to the skin of a timbrel or tambourine. It is also called Catalan vaulting (though Guastavino did not use this term) and "compression-only thin-tile vaulting".

Guastavino tile is found in some of the most prominent Beaux-Arts structures in New York and Massachusetts, as well as in major buildings across the United States. In New York City, these include the Grand Central Oyster Bar & Restaurant and the remnants of the Della Robbia Bar at the former Vanderbilt Hotel at 4 Park Avenue. It is also found in some non-Beaux-Arts structures such as the crossing of the Cathedral of St. John the Divine.

Construction
They are usually set in three herringbone-pattern courses with a sandwich of thin layers of Portland cement. Unlike heavier stone construction, these tile domes could be built without centering. Supporting formwork was still required for structural arches which established a framework for the ceiling. The large openings framed by the support arches were then filled in with thin Guastavino tiles fabricated into domed surfaces. Each ceiling tile was cantilevered out over the open space, relying only on the quick-drying cements developed by the company. Akoustolith, a special sound-absorbing tile, was one of several trade names used by Guastavino.

Significance

Guastavino tile has both structural and aesthetic significance.  

Structurally, the timbrel vault was based on traditional vernacular vaulting techniques already very familiar to Mediterranean architects, but not well known in America. Terracotta free-span timbrel vaults were far more economical and structurally resilient than the ancient Roman vaulting alternatives.  

Guastavino wrote extensively about his system of "Cohesive Construction".  As the name suggests, he believed that these timbrel vaults represented an innovation in structural engineering. The tile system provided solutions that were impossible with traditional masonry arches and vaults. Subsequent research has shown the timbrel vault is simply a masonry vault, much less thick than traditional arches, that produces less horizontal thrust due to its lighter weight. This permits flatter arch profiles, which would produce unacceptable horizontal thrust if constructed in thicker, heavier masonry.

Exhibitions
In 2012, a group of students under supervision of MIT professor John Ochsendorf built a full-scale reproduction of a small Guastavino vault.  The resulting structure was exhibited, as well as a time lapse video documenting the construction process.

Ochsendorf also curated Palaces for the People, an exhibition featuring the history and legacy of Guastavino which was premiered in September 2012 at the Boston Public Library, Rafael Guastavino's first major architectural work in America.  The exhibition then traveled to the National Building Museum in Washington DC, and an expanded version later appeared at the Museum of the City of New York.  Ochsendorf, a winner of the MacArthur Foundation "genius grant", also wrote the book-length color-illustrated monograph Guastavino Vaulting: The Art of Structural Tile, and an online exhibition coordinated with the traveling exhibits.

In addition, Ochsendorf directs the Guastavino Project at MIT, which researches and maintains the Guastavino.net online archive of related materials.

Archival sources
The Guastavino company was headquartered in Woburn, Massachusetts, in a building of their own design which still stands. The records and drawings of the Guastavino Fireproof Construction Company are preserved by the Department of Drawings & Archives in the Avery Architectural and Fine Arts Library at Columbia University in New York City.

See also 

 Glazed architectural terra-cotta
 List of architectural vaults
 First Church of Christ, Scientist (Cambridge, Massachusetts)
 Ed Koch Queensboro Bridge
 Basilica of St. Lawrence, Asheville 
 Biltmore Estate
 Grant's Tomb
 Grand Central Oyster Bar & Restaurant

Notes

Further reading

External links

 PalacesForThePeople.com  global database of Guastavino sites with photos. Created as a companion to a museum exhibition that traveled to three American museums, 2012-2014.
 Guastavino.net: documenting Guastavino's work in the Boston area. This page provides copies of writings and patents by the Guastavinos as well.
 Rafaelguastavino.com: documenting Guastavino's work in  New York City
 "CONSTRUCTION OF A VAULT", Massachusetts Institute of Technology (shows method of construction)

Tiling
Building materials
Masonry
Structural system
Architecture in Spain